Alireza Asadabadi (born 23 July 2002) is an Iranian footballer who plays as a forward for Iranian club Shahr Khodro.

Club career
Asadabadi made his debut in the Persian Gulf Pro League for Shahr Khodro, appearing off the bench against Foolad.

Honours

International 
Iran U16
 AFC U-16 Championship runner-up: 2016

Iran U19
 CAFA Junior Championship 2019

References

External links
 
 Alireza Asadabadi at PersianLeague.com

2002 births
Living people
Iranian footballers
People from Kerman
Association football forwards
Paykan F.C. players
Shahr Khodro F.C. players
Persian Gulf Pro League players
Iran youth international footballers